WOGA (92.3 FM, "WOGA in Tioga") is a radio station broadcasting a Classic Hits music format. Licensed to Mansfield, Pennsylvania, United States, the stations former owner is Kristin Cantrell, through licensee Southern Belle, LLC, who acquired the station from the now-dismantled Allegheny Mountain Radio Network.

On June 2, 2017, WOGA changed their format from Hot AC to classic hits, branded as "WOGA in Tioga".

References

External links

OGA
Classic hits radio stations in the United States
Tioga County, Pennsylvania
Radio stations established in 2000
2000 establishments in Pennsylvania